is a women's volleyball team based in Kashiwa, Chiba, Japan. It plays in V.League Division 2. The club was founded in 2001.
The owner of the team is Tensenkai Medical Corporation.

History
Founded in 2001
Promoted to V.Challenge League in 2003
Joined V.League Division 2 in 2018 
(May 1, 2020) Changed the name of the team to Chiba Angel Cross

League results

Current squad
2021-2022 Squad, as of 14 January 2022

Former players
Akika Hattori
Hideko Murakami
 Yumi Mizuguchi
 Chinatsu Tabei
 Yumeno Hashizume
 Yukie Inamasu
 Rieko Sato
 Nanae Yashi
 Chika Nakamoto
 Yukako Suzuki 
 Naomi Yamamoto  (2016–2020)
 Haruka Suzuki (2016–2020)
 Mai Jono (2017–2021)
 Shiori Kimura (2017–2021) Transferred to Veertien Mie volleyball club

References

External links
Chiba Angel Cross Official website

Japanese volleyball teams
Volleyball clubs established in 2001
2001 establishments in Japan